Sophie Kasaei (born 8 November 1989) is an English television personality. She appeared on the MTV reality series Geordie Shore from 2011 to 2013 and returned to the series from 2016 to 2019. She also appeared on Celebrity Ex on the Beach in 2020. Kasaei has made several appearances on the Geordie Shore spinoff, Geordie Shore OGs and she has also appeared on Just Tattoo of Us in 2017 alongside then boyfriend Joel Corry. In 2023 she joined the cast of the ITVBe reality series The Only Way is Essex.

Career
Kasaei joined Geordie Shore in 2011 during series 1, but was axed from the series in 2013 after she used a racial slur off camera, but returned during the Geordie Shore: Big Birthday Battle series, she left the series in 2019 following the nineteenth series. In 2020 Kasaei appeared on Celebrity Ex on the Beach.

Personal life
Kaesai is cousins with former Geordie Shore co-star Marnie Simpson. From 2011 to 2017 Kasaei dated Joel Corry a producer and record label owner.

Filmography

Guest appearances
Celebrity Big Brother 18 (2016, Episode 21)

References

1989 births
Living people

External links